Didesmethylsibutramine (BTS-54524) is an active metabolite of the anorectic drug sibutramine that has been identified as an adulterant in weight loss supplements. Data on the activity of didesmethylsibutramine in humans is limited, although a case of psychosis associated with didesmethylsibutramine use was reported in 2019.

Pharmacology

Didesmethylsibutramine acts as a triple reuptake inhibitor, blocking the reabsorption of serotonin, dopamine, and norepinephrine from neuronal synapses. The (R)-enantiomer of didesmethylsibutramine is a more potent inhibitor of monoamine reuptake than the (S)-enantiomer and possesses significantly stronger anorectic activity in animals.

Pharmacokinetics  

Following sibutramine administration in humans, didesmethylsibutramine (M2) is formed through the n-demethylation of desmethylsibutramine (M1) by CYP2B6. Elevated plasma levels of sibutramine are observed with concomitant use of CYP2B6 inhibitors (e.g. clopidogrel) and in individuals with certain CYP2B6 genotypes due to the reduced conversion of sibutramine into desmethylsibutramine (M1).

References 

Serotonin–norepinephrine–dopamine reuptake inhibitors
Anorectics
Chlorobenzenes
Cyclobutanes
Phenethylamines
Substituted amphetamines
Monoamine reuptake inhibitors